Masti is a series of Indian sex comedy film series. The series is directed by Indra Kumar and produced by Ashok Thakeria. The series stars Vivek Oberoi, Aftab Shivdasani and Riteish Deshmukh in principal roles.

Overview

Masti (2004)

Masti revolves around three bachelors, Meet (Vivek Oberoi), Prem (Aftab Shivdasani) and Amar (Riteish Deshmukh). Their lives are good until they get married and their lives turn to hell. Meet marries Anchal (Amrita Rao) who is obsessively possessive about her husband. Prem marries Geeta (Tara Sharma) who is overly religious and thus their sex life suffers. Amar marries Bindiya (Genelia D'Souza) who is dominating and lives with her mother (Archana Puran Singh). The friends get together one night and try to think of a way to get away from their wives for some time and relive their fun bachelor days. The men set their sights on other women but eventually realise they have all been seeing the same girl, Monica (Lara Dutta). She blackmails them about revealing their affair to their wives for Rs. 1 million.

The terrified men arrive at Monica's car with all the money, only to find her dead. To not be accused, they try to hide her body, interrupted by police officer Sikander (Ajay Devgan) who begins to suspect, and then starts following, them. Thereafter, the trio goes to Monica's house for further investigation. Insp. Sikander traces the three who hide at Monica's verandah. Next morning, a mysterious man finds them and reveals that he killed Monica and demands ransom to cover the crime. The trio, guilt-ridden goes to their respective wives to apologise. But the very next day, the killer traces them and chases them in a car. Unknown to them, they shoot the killer and escape but end up in jail. After their wives show up, it is revealed that it was just a prank played on them and reveals Monica is alive and the killer turns to be a police officer. The men then apologise their wives and promise to never do "Masti" again.

Grand Masti (2013)

Three friends – Meet (Vivek Oberoi), Prem (Aftab Shivdasani) and Amar (Riteish Deshmukh), who are married and don't like their wives: Meet thinks his wife Unatti (Karishma Tanna) is having an affair with her boss, Prem doesn't like it when his wife Tulsi (Manjari Fadnis) doesn't spend quality time with him and Amar hates his marital life because his wife Mamta (Sonalee Kulkarni) is more concerned about their son, Pappu.

One day, the trio receive an invite from their college, SLUTS (Sri Lalchand University of Technology And Science), to attend their college reunion. Their wives don't come with them, so the trio decide to have Grand Masti there to escape their boredom.

When they arrive, they see the women full clothed and the boys too afraid to express their love for them. This all due to the fear of a Principal Roberts (Pradeep Rawat), who hangs people naked on a tree if they disagree with his rules. They find out that their former colleague, Hardik (Suresh Menon), is in the mental asylum because of the principal. Meanwhile, Prem meets one of his former teachers, Rose (Maryam Zakaria), and is attracted to her. Meet meets Marlow (Kainaat Arora) and is attracted to her. Amar meets Mary (Bruna Abdullah) and is attracted to her. The trio then goes to the girl's place to have sex with them. But just when they were about to do it, they find out that Marlow, Mary and Rose are relatives of the principal. The principal chases them down thinking they had sex with Marlow, Mary and Rose, but they get away as their wives come to spend time with them.

The trio then get an MMS showing them the footage of them having sex. Luckily, the video doesn't meet the eyes of their wives. They then find out that it was Hardik who sent them the video, and he blackmails them. Their task is to kill the principal to fulfill Hardik's revenge. They fail in killing him, so they decide to try and delete the videos off Hardik's phone. They succeed, and continue to spend their time at the reunion.

It's the last day, and the vengeful principal has put pills inside the soup which attract people to the ones they love. The trio end up being with the girls, and the principal catches them red handed. The girls then reveal that the principal is impotent. The trio then get chased by the principal along with the attracted girls, but then when the trio end up on the roof of a building, Hardik pushes the principal and the principal slides down the roof and hangs on to a bar. The trio try to save him but Hardik pushes them too and they hang onto the principal. The girls come and push Hardik off the roof and he hangs on to Meet. The trio then tell principal the truth about not having sex with Marlow, Mary and Rose. The girls try to make a rope out of their clothes, but the boys fall and end up in the hospital. The trio wives angrily ask them what exactly happened that night. Principal Roberts calmly replies that due to a misunderstood affair, their husband suffered this consequence. Shortly later, a doctor comes and informs the principal that he is no more impotent since the blood now properly flows all over his body due to the pressure generated while hanging on the bar. Hardik marries Marlow and the film ends up Roberts, Hardik and the trio about to have sex with their respective wives with everything now going well.

Great Grand Masti (2016)

The film features three friends Amar, Meet and Prem who always want fun (Masti). The film begins with the title song where the three friends marry Sapna, Rekha and Nisha. They are unhappy with their marital lives because of their brother-in-law, sister-in-law, and mother-in-law. Amar's mother-in-law wants her late husband to be reborn and on the order of a fraud baba (fake spiritual leader) she has stopped her daughter from having any physical relations with Amar for over six months to achieve the rebirth of her late husband. Prem's sister-in-law is attractive but silly, she comes to live with them and wants to sleep with her elder sister, forcing Prem to sleep on the couch away from his wife. Meet's wife is a twin and whenever he tries to go near his wife, it turns on his brother-in-law (who is a body builder). The connection between the two twins causes great problems like Meet's wife beating him up unintentionally when her brother is beating some goon up.

One day they meet in a bar and decide to enjoy their lives. They decide to go to Amar's village to sell off his family haveli (old mansion) and meanwhile have fun with the beautiful ladies in the village. When they reach the village, they find out that people are scared of the haveli. An old man tells them that there used to be a father daughter duo who lived in the haveli 50 years ago, the daughter, Ragini was very beautiful and many boys were smitten by her beauty but her father never let any guy near her, at the age of 20, Ragini died due to snake bite but her soul still resides in the haveli in search of a man who'll do masti with her. 
The guys laugh it off and proceed towards the haveli, there they meet a very attractive girl who's been living secretly in the haveli as she is alone and has nowhere to go. The boys hire her as their maid and each one starts trying to attract her. Soon it is revealed that she is indeed Ragini and she informs the boys that one of them must sleep with her in order to free her soul and whoever does so will die. The boys get scared and try escaping the mansion but to no avail. Prem commits to doing so in front of Ragini to buy them some time and meanwhile they hire Babu Rangeela, a male prostitute to sleep with Ragini. But on the last moment their wives show up and Ragini turns Babu into a chicken. Ragini makes the boys do weird stuff in front of their wives and in laws who join them at the haveli so they would leave. When the boys see that their wives are secretly fasting for them even when Ragini depicted them off as such perverts in front of them, they decide to confront Ragini. The meet Ragini and tell her they won't sleep with her and she can't harm them as their wives are fasting for their long lives. Ragini hurts them but they light fire around her and call her father's spirit to help them. Rather Babu's spirit comes (who was cooked by the three wives) and does Masti with Ragini hence satisfying her urge. Babu and Ragini leave the world together and the three couples live happily ever after.

Masti 4 (2024)
Ritesh Deshmukh, Vivek Oberoi, Aftab Shivdasani, Diana Penty, Ileana D'Cruz, Kriti Kharbanda will be star in Indra Kumar's Masti 4 which will be titled as Maha Masti.

Cast and characters

Crew

Release and revenue

References

External links
 

 
 

 
 

2000s Hindi-language films
2010s Hindi-language films
Indian film series
Comedy film series